David McMeeking (8 August 1937 – 29 March 2013) was a South African cricketer. He played one first-class match for Western Province in 1965/66.

References

External links
 

1937 births
2013 deaths
South African cricketers
Western Province cricketers
Cricketers from Cape Town